This is a list of people from Luxembourg.

Politics

Jean of Luxembourg (1921–2019), former Grand Duke
Henri of Luxembourg (born 1955), current Grand Duke
Victor Bodson (1902–1984), justice minister, Righteous Among the Nations
Jean-Claude Juncker (born 1954), Luxembourg prime minister, EC president
Jacques Santer (born 1937), Luxembourg prime minister, EC president
Martine Schommer (born 1961), diplomat
Robert Schuman (1886–1963), French prime minister, EU co-founder
Gaston Thorn (1928–2007), Luxembourg politician, EC president
Pierre Werner (1913–2002), Luxembourg prime minister, EEC figure

Arts and culture

Pol Albrecht (1874–1975), composer
Louis Beicht (1886–1943), composer
Charles Bernhoeft (1859–1933), photographer
Emile Boeres (1890–1944), composer
Pierre Brandebourg (1824–1878), painter and photographer
Josy Braun (1938–2012), writer 
Elisabeth Calmes (born 1947), painter
Sandrine Cantoreggi (born 1969), violinist
Sophie Carle (born 1964), singer and actress
Claus Cito (1882–1965), sculptor
Jim Clemes (born 1957), architect 
Simone Decker (born 1968), artist
Michel Engels (1851–1901), illustrator, painter
Tatiana Fabeck (born 1970), architect 
Batty Fischer (1877–1958), amateur photographer
Jean-Baptiste Fresez (1800–1867), artist 
Johny Fritz (born 1944), composer
Patrick Galbats (born 1978), photographer  
Hugo Gernsback (1884–1967), writer, editor, publisher
Thérèse Glaesener-Hartmann (1858–1923), painter
Gust Graas (1924–2020), artist and businessman
Françoise Groben (1965–2011), cellist
Ernie Hammes (born 1968), trumpeter
Georges Hausemer (born 1957), writer
Guy Helminger (born 1963), writer  
Nico Helminger (born 1953), writer  
Max Jacoby (born 1977), filmmaker
Pierre Joris (born 1946), poet
Gustave Kahnt (1848–1923), composer
Jean-Pierre Kemmer (1923–1991), composer, conductor, choir master
Mariette Kemmer (born 1953), opera singer
Théo Kerg (1909–1993), artist 
Camille Kerger (born 1957), composer, opera singer  
Will Kesseler (1899–1983), painter
Jean-Marie Kieffer (born 1960), composer
Emile Kirscht (1913–1994), painter
Nico Klopp (1894–1930), painter
Anise Koltz (born 1928), poet
Vicky Krieps (born 1983), actress
Jean Krier (born 1949), poet  
Leon Krier (born 1946), architect
Edouard Kutter (1887–1978), photographer
Edouard Kutter (born 1934), photographer
Joseph Kutter (1894–1941), painter
Paul Kutter (1863–1937), photographer
Yvon Lambert (born 1955), photographer
Dominique Lang (1874–1919), painter 
Claude Lenners (born 1956), composer 
Georges Lentz (born 1965), composer
Michel Lentz (1820–1893), poet
Nicolas Liez (1809–1892), lithographer, painter
Hana Sofia Lopes (born 1990), actress
Marianne Majerus (born 1956), photographer
Michel Majerus (born 1967–2002), artist
Laurent Menager (1835–1902), composer
Antoine Meyer (1801–1857), poet and mathematician 
Bady Minck (born 1960), artist and filmmaker
Alexander Mullenbach (born 1949), composer
Jean Muller (born 1979), pianist
Joseph-Alexandre Müller (1854–1931), composer
Désirée Nosbusch (born 1965), actress
Joseph Probst (1911–1997), artist
Harry Rabinger (1895–1966), painter  
Michel Reis (born 1982), jazz pianist
Jérôme Reuter (born 1981), musician 
Guy Rewenig (born 1947), writer
Nathalie Ronvaux (born 1977), poet, playwright
Pol Sax (born 1960), writer 
Lambert Schlechter (born 1941), writer
Francesco Tristano Schlimé (born 1981), pianist
Arlette Schneiders (born late 1950s), architect
Bettina Scholl-Sabbatini (born 1942), sculptor 
Pascal Schumacher (born 1979), jazz musician
Frantz Seimetz (1858–1934), painter  
Edward Steichen (1879–1973), photographer
Marie Henriette Steil (1898–1930), writer
Michel Stoffel (1903–1963), painter 
Félix Thyes (1830–1855), writer   
Foni Tissen (1909–1975), artist
Su-Mei Tse (born 1973), musician, photographer, sculptor
Nora Wagener (born 1989), writer
Gast Waltzing (born 1956), jazz musician, composer
 Batty Weber (1860–1940), writer
Sosthène Weis (1872–1941), painter, architect
Marcel Wengler (born 1946), composer
Lucien Wercollier (1908–2002), sculptor

Academia
Emil Hirsch (1851–1923), rabbi
William Justin Kroll (1889–1973), metallurgical engineer 
Christiane Linster (born 1962), neuroscientist
Gabriel Lippmann (1845–1921), physicist (Luxembourg-born)
Arno J. Mayer (born 1926), historian
Félicien M. Steichen (1926–2011), surgeon
Beatrice Schofield (born 1997), neuroscientist

Sports

Josy Barthel (1927–1992), athlete, Olympic gold in 1952
François Faber (1887–1915), cyclist
Nicolas Frantz (1899–1985), cyclist
Charly Gaul (1932–2005), cyclist
Marc Girardelli (born 1963), skier
John Grün (1868–1912), strongman
Bob Jungels (born 1992), cyclist
Kim Kirchen (born 1978), cyclist
Gilles Müller (born 1983), tennis player
Andy Schleck (born 1985), cyclist
Fränk Schleck (born 1980), cyclist
Michel Théato (1878–1919), runner
Christine Majerus (born 1987), cyclist

Other
Katell Guillou (born 1972), French-born restaurateur running two Michelin-starred restaurants in Luxembourg
Wilhelm von Knyphausen (1716–1800), general during the American Revolution (Luxembourg-born)
Norbert von Kunitzki (1934–2005), businessman and economist 
Léa Linster (born 1955), award-winning chef
Henri Tudor (1859–1928), inventor and industrialist
Susanna van Tonder (born 1988), disability rights activist, patient advocate and blogger
Jean-Claude Biver (born 1949), watchmaker, cheese maker and businessman, currently president of LVMH watch division